Anneli Granget (11 August 1935 – 25 April 1971) was a German stage and television actress.

Career 
Anneli Granget was born in Königsberg, East Prussia. She began her film and stage career at the end of the 1950s. For eight years, she was a member of the Nuremberg Ensemble; after 1970, she appeared there as a guest. She performed as a guest at the Nuremberg Playhouse at the Staatstheater Nürnberg, the Ruhrfestspiele in Recklinghausen and others.

Her first role on television was Svanhild Magnussen in the five-part television movie Am grünen Strand der Spree and brought her name to the public's attention. Afterward, she primarily played leading roles, such as the role of "Trudel Baumann" in Hans Fallada's Jeder stirbt für sich allein in 1962, directed by Falk Harnack and starring Edith Schultze-Westrum and Alfred Schieske. In 1968, she played "Nurse Inge" (German: Schwester Inge) in the 13-part television miniseries, Hafenkrankenhaus. Her last television role was in 1970 in Gerhart Hauptmann's drama, Vor Sonnenuntergang, with Werner Hinz and Cordula Trantow.

Personal life 
Granget was married to actor Hannes Riesenberger, with whom she shared the stage several times. They had one son. Suffering from depression, she took her life on 25 April 1971.

Filmography 
 Am grünen Strand der Spree (1960, TV Mini-Series) as Svanhild Magnussen
 Eine etwas sonderbare Dame (1960, TV Movie) (with Brigitte Horney) as Florence
 Unseliger Sommer (1961, TV Movie) (with Ullrich Haupt) as Peggy
 Anfrage (1962, TV Movie, directed by Egon Monk) as Sekretärin
 Nachruf auf Jürgen Trahnke (1962, TV Movie, directed by Rolf Hädrich) (with Ernst Jacobi) as Bärbel
 Jeder stirbt für sich allein (1962, TV Movie, directed by Falk Harnack) as Trudel Baumann
 Der Schatten (1963, TV Movie) as Annunziata
 Die Gerechten (1964, TV Movie) (with Christoph Bantzer) as Dora Dulkebow
 Briefe der Liebe (1964, TV Series)
 Zeitvertreib (1964, TV Movie) as Karin
 Ankunft bei Nacht (Verwehte Spuren) (1965, TV Movie) as Igna Vargas
 Im Jahre Neun (1966, TV Movie) (with Gerd Baltus and Hans Söhnker) as Asta-Vertreterin / Nelda
 Liebesgeschichten (1967, TV Series) as Louise Dowd / Anne Thornton
 Hafenkrankenhaus (1968) (with Rolf Schimpf) as Schwester Inge
 Der Punkt »M« (1969, TV Movie) as Elsa Reinfahl
 Vor Sonnenuntergang (1970, TV Movie) (with Werner Hinz, Cordula Trantow, Doris Schade) as Ottilie Klamroth (final film role)

Audio plays 
 Das Opfer von Treblinka - Die Geschichte des Kostek Wittkowsky (1958), with Erik Schumann and P. Walter Jacob
 Die ungleichen Brüder (1958), with Lina Carstens
 Geh nicht nach El Kuwehd (1960), by Günter Eich (Schirin), with Horst Sachtleben
 Um Mitternacht (1960), with Arnold Marquis
 Gottes liebe Kinder (1961)
 Die beiden Tabakspfeifen (Die Motte) (1961), with Walter Richter and Angelika Hurwicz
 Die ganze Wahrheit und nichts als die Wahrheit (1966), with Erik Schumann
 Anna und Wassilij (1968)

References

External links 

German stage actresses
Actors from Nuremberg
1935 births
1971 deaths
Actors from Königsberg
People from East Prussia
German television actresses
20th-century German actresses
1971 suicides
Suicides in Germany